Sakaya may refer to:

Sakaya (dialect), a dialect of the Barein language
Sakaya, California, former Native American settlement